Carla Gravina (born 5 August 1941) is an Italian actress and politician. She received a Cannes Film Festival Award for Best Actress for her role in La terrazza (1980). Her other notable roles were in Love and Chatter (1957), Esterina (1959), and The Long Silence (1993). Gravina used to be a member of the Chamber of Deputies.

Life and career
Born in Gemona, Gravina made her film debut at fifteen years old, in Alberto Lattuada's Guendalina. Very active in films and on television series, both in comedic and dramatic roles, from the late 1970s she gradually focused her activities on stage and in political activism, being a PCI deputy between 1980 and 1983. Gravina was involved in a long-term relationship with fellow Italian actor Gian Maria Volontè with whom she had a child.

Awards
During her career Gravina won a number of international awards, including the Best Actress Award for her performance in Alessandro Blasetti's Love and Chatter at the 1958 Locarno International Film Festival, the award for Best Supporting Actress for her role in Ettore Scola's La terrazza at the 1980 Cannes Film Festival, and the award for Best Actress for Margarethe von Trotta's The Long Silence at the 1993 Montreal World Film Festival.

Selected filmography

  Love and Chatter (1957)
 Big Deal on Madonna Street (1958)
 First Love (1959)
 Policarpo (1959)
 Esterina (1959)
 Everybody Go Home (1960)
 Five Branded Women (1960)
 A Day for Lionhearts (1961)
 A Bullet for the General (1966)
 Bandits in Milan (1968)
 The Seven Cervi Brothers (1968)
 Cuore di mamma (1969)
 The Lady of Monza (1969)
 The Invisible Woman (1969)
 Il segno del comando (1971)
 Without Apparent Motive (1971)
 Il caso Pisciotta (1972)
 Alfredo, Alfredo (1972)
 Tony Arzenta (1973)
 The Inheritor (1973)
 The Antichrist (1974)
 And Now My Love (1974)
 Boomerang (1976)
 La terrazza (1980)
 Days of Inspector Ambrosio (1988)
 The Long Silence (1993)

References

External links

1941 births
Living people
Cannes Film Festival Award for Best Actress winners
People from Gemona del Friuli
Italian Communist Party politicians
Deputies of Legislature VIII of Italy
Politicians of Friuli-Venezia Giulia
Italian film actresses
20th-century Italian actresses
Italian television actresses
Italian stage actresses